Ann "AJ" Griffin is an American politician who served as a member of the Oklahoma Senate from the 20th district between 2012 and 2018. She was first elected in 2012 to succeed David Myers after he died of pneumonia late 2011. In March 2018, she announced she would retire from office at the end of her term in 2018.

References

21st-century American politicians
21st-century American women politicians
Republican Party Oklahoma state senators
Living people
Year of birth missing (living people)
Women state legislators in Oklahoma